Ndidi Okonkwo Nwuneli (born 22 March 1975) is a Nigerian entrepreneur, an expert on African agriculture and nutrition, philanthropy, and social innovation. She has over 25 years of international development experience and is a recognized serial entrepreneur, author, public speaker, and consultant. Through her work in the private, public, and nonprofit sectors, she has led the design and execution of high-impact initiatives focused on policy, strategy, organizational design, ecosystem solutions, and growth.

Early life 
Ndidi Okonkwo was born on March 22, 1975 at the University of Nigeria Teaching Hospital in Enugu, Nigeria to a Nigerian professor of Pharmacology—Paul Obuekwe Okonkwo and an American professor of History—Rina Okonkwo.

Her father, who is from Awka, Anambra and her mother who is originally from New York, met at Cornell University in 1965. Her parents were educators by profession. They taught and mentored students with the goal of improving the Nigerian Education System. In an interview with the National Mirror Nwuneli explains, “I was born the third of five children. My parents[....]exposed my siblings and I to the concept of patriotism and service from very young ages....during the dark years of the late General Sani Abacha years, when many professors fled outside the country, my parents stuck it out, going for many months without salaries. Even with these challenges, holidays in our home were devoted to giving to others; trips to orphanages and other charity organizations formed a critical part of our socialization".

Education background
She grew up in Enugu, where she attended primary school at University Primary School. She attended secondary school at the Federal Government College Enugu from 1986 to 1991. From 1991 to 1992, she completed a bridging program, combining her final year of high school and freshmen year of college at the Clarkson School in Potsdam, New York.

Education 

Nwuneli attended The Wharton School, University of Pennsylvania in 1992, where she concentrated in strategic management and multinational management. She is a recipient of the Albert A. Berg Scholarship and was also selected to become a member of the Friars and the Onyx Senior Societies for her outstanding leadership efforts. In addition, she was the president of the Penn African Students Association, and a member of several societies including the Penn Gospel Choir and the Black Students Union. She was also an intern at Mitchell & Titus and Arthur Andersen. In May 1995, at 20 years old, Nwuneli graduated magna cum laude with a Bachelor of Science in Economics.

By 1997, she was enrolled at Harvard Business School (HBS). While there, she received both the Harvey Fellowship and the National Black MBA Association Graduate Scholarship, both recognizing her academic accomplishments. Her extracurricular activities at Harvard include founding and Co-chairing the Annual African Business Conference; Vice President of Faculty and Student Affairs for the Africa Business Club; International Liaison for the African American Student Union; and Publicity Chair for the Christian Association. She graduated with her MBA at 24 in 1999.

Career 

Nwuneli's career began in her junior year at The University of Pennsylvania when she held a Summer Business Analyst position with McKinsey & Company in New York. In 1995, she was offered a full-time position at McKinsey as a Business Analyst working out of Chicago, Illinois. She also worked for McKinsey in their office in Johannesburg, South Africa. Her work with McKinsey in 1997 led to the management and training of police officers across 25 South African Police Service Stations, as well as an increase in criminal convictions and a reduction in crime rates.

In 1998, she accepted a position as the Lead Consultant with a non-profit founded by Professor Michael Porter called The Center for Middle East Competitive Strategy. She consulted with Palestinian and Israeli businesses and made recommendations for decreasing transaction costs and increasing trade across the region.

Work in Nigeria 

In 1999, Nwuneli worked as the Lead Consultant for The Ford Foundation on a project focusing on Nigeria's largest microcredit institutions, COWAN and FADU. That year, she rejoined McKinsey and served on client service teams, consulting for consumer goods companies and large American retailers. In 2000, she resigned from her position at McKinsey and returned to Nigeria to serve as the Executive Director for the FATE Foundation (founded by Nigerian Businessman, Fola Adeola). In an interview with HBS African America Alumni Association about engaging female entrepreneurs, she explains: "Nigeria has some of the most entrepreneurial people in the world but access to financing, networks, and growth remain a challenge[...]I believe empowering women to start and grow their businesses is critical to Nigeria's development, but educating women is the real silver bullet."

In 2002, Nwuneli founded two nonprofits, LEAP (Leadership, Effectiveness, Accountability, Professionalism) Africa and Ndu Ike Akunuba (NIA), Igbo words which translate in English to Life, Strength, and Wealth. NIA's focus is on female empowerment—inspiring university students in Southeastern Nigeria to live full and meaningful lives. LEAP Africa is a youth-focused leadership development nonprofit organization. LEAP provides training on leadership, ethics and civics. As the founder of the organization, she has been invited to speak at the UN Commission for Social Development, the World Economic Forum and the Clinton Global Initiative.

LEAP has worked in partnership with the Ford Foundation, Citi Foundation, World Bank, United States Government, UK Foreign & Commonwealth Office, ALI (Aspen Institute's Africa Leadership Initiative), Nokia, and the International Youth Foundation. Nwuneli served as LEAP Africa's founder and chief executive officer from 2002 to 2007 and is still an active Board Member in the organization.

Entrepreneurial pursuits 

In 2010, Nwuneli and her husband Mezuo Nwuneli, Co-Founded Sahel Capital Partners and Advisory Limited and AACE Foods. In 2016, Sahel Capital separated its management consulting and private equity businesses, and Sahel Capital Agribusiness Managers Ltd. was established. In 2018, Sahel Capital Partners & Advisory Limited changed its name to Sahel Consulting Agriculture and Nutrition Limited to fully embrace its mandate as a consulting company, and its focus on the agriculture and nutrition landscapes. AACE's work in promoting nutrition, supporting smallholder farmers, and displacing imports have been recognized by the Africa Diaspora Marketplace, IAP, and AECF. Both firms have served as catalysts in the Nigerian and West African agribusiness landscape.

In 2020, Nwuneli founded, and is the chair of a digital knowledge, financing, and data hub which is enabling agribusiness entrepreneurs in 34 African countries to scale.

Ndidi's goal is to turn West Africa's food to its new gold by engaging the agricultural landscape and building its ecosystem

Governance and boards 

Nwuneli is on the Board of LEAP Africa, AACE Foods, Fairfax Africa Fund, Godrej Group, DSM Sustainability Advisory Board, AGRA, GAIN - Global Alliance for Improved Nutrition, and Nigerian Breweries Plc. Previously, she participated in the World Economic Forum as a committee member on the Global Agenda Council on New Models of Leadership from 2011 to 2014.

In 2019, an American Philanthropic organization, Rockefeller Foundation appointed Nwuneli to its board.

In 2021, Mrs Ndidi Nwuneli was appointed  on the Board of the Nigerian Economic Summit Group.

Awards and recognition 

 Alumni Achievement Award from Harvard Business School, 2021
Named amongst Schwab Foundation's Social Innovators, 2020
Honoree of the Global Fund for Women during their 25th Anniversary Celebration in San Francisco, 2013
 Winner of the Harvard Business School Nigeria Business Club 2013 Leading Social Entrepreneur Award
Forbes: 20 Youngest Power Women In Africa, 2011
 Excellence Award from Anambra State, 2011
 Selected for Harvard Business School's Africa Business Club's Excellence Award, 2007
 Selected as Young Manager of the Year by THISDAY Newspapers (Nigeria's leading newspaper), 2005
Received a National Honor – Member of the Federal Republic – from the President of the Federal Republic of Nigeria on December 16, 2004
 Selected as a Young Global Leader by the World Economic Forum, Davos; 2004
 Selected as a Global Leader of Tomorrow by the World Economic Forum, Davos, Switzerland; 2002

Author and research

Author, Food Entrepreneurs in Africa: Scaling Resilient Agriculture Businesses (routledge.com), 2021
Author,  Social Innovation In Africa: A practical guide for scaling impact - 1s (routledge.com), 2016
Author, Working for God in the Marketplace, 2005

Publications 
 Author, Food Entrepreneurs in Africa: Scaling Resilient Agriculture Businesses, 2021
Author, Social Innovation in Africa; 2016 
Editor, Passing the Baton, LEAP Africa; 2011
Lead Author, Building a Culture of Ethics: A Practical Guide for African Leaders in the Public, Private and Nonprofits Sectors, LEAP Africa; 2009
Editor, Rage for Change: A Practical Guide for African youth who Desire to Make a Difference, LEAP Africa; 2008
Editor/Co-Author, Get on Board: A Practical Guide to Establishing & Sustaining High-Impact Boards of Directors, Farafina; 2007
Lead Author, Defying the Odds: Case Studies of Nigerian Companies that have Survived Generations, LEAP Africa, 2006
Articles on leadership, management and ethics: Under the Tree of Talking (Funded by the British Council), Journal of Convergence, Farafina, Business Day, the Guardian and Business in Africa Magazine; 2003-2007

References 

Harvard Business School alumni
McKinsey & Company
Wharton School of the University of Pennsylvania alumni
1975 births
Nigerian expatriates in the United States
Living people
People from Enugu
Social entrepreneurs
Nigerian nonprofit businesspeople
Nigerian women company founders
Nigerian people of American descent
Nigerian management consultants
Members of the Order of the Federal Republic
Federal Government College Enugu alumni